Volos Municipal Radio (104.6 FM) was a municipality-owned radio station in Volos, Greece, operating since 1993 until its closure in 2012.

References

Defunct radio stations in Greece
Radio stations established in 1993
1993 establishments in Greece
Municipal radio in Greece
Mass media in Thessaly
Volos